Comfortably Uncomfortable is the debut album from American rock band the Jealous Girlfriends. It was self-released on August 22, 2005.

Track listing 
 "Birthday Song" - 3:13
 "Diffusive Dreaming" - 2:23
 "Lay Around" - 5:21
 "Airport Security" - 3:50
 "Mother May I" - 3:11
 "Whoever You Are" - 3:40
 "Please, Please, Please Let Me Get What I Want" - 3:48
 "Indifference" - 7:19

2005 debut albums
Self-released albums
The Jealous Girlfriends albums